Lamb Island is a 2009 short dramatic film shot on Lamb Island, Queensland in Australia about a quiet woman who keeps her sorrows, pain and grief to herself. Things start to change when a stranger arrives on the island and decides to bring the peace and quiet to an end.

Cast 
 Margi Brown Ash as 'Myla Harris'
 Amanda McErlean as 'Shopkeeper'
 Lauren Orrell as 'Stranger'

Production 
The film was developed and produced by QPIX under its Screen Australia Raw Nerve Short Film Initiative, in association with Screen Development Australia. QPIX is also financially assisted by the Pacific Film & Television Commission (now Screen Queensland).

References

External links 
 

Australian drama short films
2009 films
Films set on islands
2000s English-language films
2000s Australian films